Dr. Howard J. Wall is an economist and the director of the Hammond Institute for Free Enterprise at Lindenwood University, St. Charles, Missouri. He is also a research scholar at the Show-Me Institute, a think tank in St. Louis, Missouri. Wall was previously a vice president at the Federal Reserve Bank of St. Louis, and taught at West Virginia University and Birkbeck College, University of London.

Education 

Dr. Wall received his B.A. from the State University of New York at Binghamton and his M.A. and Ph.D from the University of Buffalo.

Research 

Dr. Wall has written or co-written 75 papers, which have been cited almost 5,500 times. His work has been published in the Review of Economics and Statistics, The Economic Journal, Journal of Urban Economics, Journal of Money and Banking, and other outlets.

References

External links 
 Hammond Institute for Free Enterprise

Lindenwood University people
Binghamton University alumni
Year of birth missing (living people)
Living people
West Virginia University faculty
University at Buffalo alumni
Academics of Birkbeck, University of London
American economists